Vallavaraiyan Vandiyadevan was a commander of the Chola Army. He was one among the famous chieftains of the Chola emperors Rajaraja I and Rajendra I and chief of the Samanthas of North Arcot and also the husband of Rajaraja's elder sister Kunthavai Pirattiyar. He was also the chieftain of the Sri Lanka Front Army of Rajaraja l and Rajendra I. Territory under his authority was known as Vallavaraiyanadu. He ruled Brahmadesam. Vandiyathevan is idealized in Kalki Krishnamurthy's (Kalki) famous novel Ponniyin Selvan and also in many other novels like Vandiyadevan Vaal, Vandiyadevan Senai Thalaivan.

Actor Karthi portrays Vandiyathevan in the 2022 Tamil film Ponniyin Selvan, an adaptation of the novel of the same name.

Origins 
His origins and clan are subjects of great debate. Kalki Krishnamurthy strongly believed his clan is Vaanar Kulam (Vana Kingdom / Magadai Mandalam) and depicted the same in his famous novel Ponniyin Selvan

Evidences 

He is referred to in the Rajarajeshwaram Temple inscription in which he is referred to as the husband of Kundavai Piratiyar.

In popular culture

Vandhiyadevan is  one of the key characters of the novel Ponniyin Selvan. The author Kalki Krishnamurthy depicts him as a brave, adventurous and sarcastic warrior/prince, who later becomes the Commander for Southern Troops under the reign of Uttama Chola. Although the second protagonist of the story other than Ponniyin Selvan himself, Vandiyadevan's exploits make the readers to think him as the main hero at multiple points in the novel. He was a bodyguard and close friend of Aditha Karikalan in Kanchi who sends him as a messenger to Parantaka II in Thanjavur to invite him to the newly built golden palace in Kanchi and also as a trustful guard for Kundavai in Pazhayarai. His unplanned and hasteful acts put himself and others in danger but comes out of them by trickery and luck. He is the lover of Princess Kundavai. He is loved one-sidedly by Manimekalai, the sister of Kandamaran. The author introduces most of the characters to the audience through him. Many of the readers of this book admired his character and attitude more than the main protagonist Ponniyin Selvan.

A life sized statue depicting Vallavaraiyan controlling a horse was erected in Chennai during the first tenure of Mr. Karunanidhi as Chief Minister, near Gemini Flyover in Mount Road as an honour to Vallavaraiyan.  Interestingly, this also coincided with the banning of horse races by the government of Tamil Nadu.

See also
Ponniyin Selvan
Ponniyin Selvan: I

Notes

Further reading

 Ponniyin Selvan - Complete Novel in Tamil Wikisource (Unicode)
 Rajakesari, a new novel written by Gokul Seshadri, happens during the later part of Rajaraja Chola's life. It is a historic thriller that can be read in full from Varalaaru monthly e-magazine's website. To read the novel, click here
 Cherar Kottai (Part-II of Rajakesari), another novel also by Gokul Seshadri happens during the early part of Rajaraja Chola's life. It fully explains the circumstances under which Rajaraja makes his first and memorable victory over Kanthaloor Chalai - a chera martial arts academy. It is a historic fiction that can be read from Varalaaru monthly e-magazine's website.To read the novel, Click here
 “Kalvettu Sonna Kadaigal Series” in Varalaaru.com Magazine (in tamil)
 Sadasiva Pandarathar: Pirkala Chozar Varalaaru, Annamalai University Publication.

External links
Gokul Seshadri's Ponniyinselvan Facts and Fiction
 Sadasiva Pandarathar's Pirkala Chozar Varalaaru (Annamalai University Publication)

Chola dynasty
Chola Empire
Chola kings